The Tokyo Anime Awards started in 2002, but was named in 2005. The first, second and third award ceremonies were simply named 'Competition'. The award ceremonies were held at the Tokyo International Anime Fair (TAF) until 2013. In 2014, after the merger of the Tokyo International Anime Fair with the Anime Contents Expo and the formation of the AnimeJapan convention, the Tokyo Anime Awards was changed into a separate festival called Tokyo Anime Awards Festival (TAAF).

Notably, there are Open Entry Awards for amateur creators (the Grand Prize winner is awarded with one million yen). Though there are ten main judges, the total number of judges is over one hundred people. Various groups participate in judging the festival, such as anime studio staff members, professors of universities, as well as producers and chief editors of various magazines. (See also: Animation Kobe).

Animation of the Year
All anime released from December 1 of the year before the festival to November 30 of the current year in Japan become candidates. 
The anime that best represents the category it was nominated in is chosen as the winner of that category.

In the first year of the celebration, the award was given to Spirited Away as 'Grand Prix'. In the second year, there was no Animation of the Year award; therefore, the 'Best Entry Awards' in the 'Notable Entries' are often recognized as 'Grand Prix', they were: Millennium Actress (film), Hanada Shōnen-shi (TV) and Sentō Yōsei Yukikaze (OVA)

Since 2014, Tokyo Anime Award Festival has given an Anime of the Year Grand Prize in two categories, Film and Television.

Notes
a. Anime of the Year Grand Prize for Best Picture

Anime Fan Award
Picking from over 300-400 titles from television and films, anime fans vote from the candidate pool to pick the best 100 from those titles, with 20 of these titles being films and 80 being television titles. Fans then participate in a runoff vote in order to determine a recipient amongst the 100 chosen titles for the Anime Fan Award. 

Initial qualifications to become candidates required titles to have aired from November of the year before the festival to October of the current year in Japan. However, this has since been twice changed — first in 2017 to be from October to October, and again in 2020 to be from October to September.
{|class="wikitable" style="font-size: 95%;"
|-
! colspan="3" | Tokyo Anime Award Festival
|-
! Year
! Winner
! Note
|-
! 2014
| Danball Senki Wars
|
|- 
! 2015
| Tiger & Bunny: The Rising
|
|-
! 2016
| Gintama|
|-
! 2017
|rowspan="2" | Yuri on Ice|rowspan="2" | The only title to win the award twice consecutively.
|-
! 2018
|-
! 2019
| Banana Fish|
|-
! 2020
| Uta no Prince-Sama: Maji Love Kingdom|
|-
! 2021
| Idolish7: Second Beat!|
|-
! 2022
| Idolish7: Third Beat!|Only applies to the 1st Cour.
|-
! 2023
| Mechamato| The first non-Japanese-produced animation to win in this category.
|}

Open Entries / Competition Grand Prize
The awards for the creator of the non-commercialized work for TV, movie and OVA, to find new talents and to provide support for subsequent commercialization. The work must be an animation longer than 15 seconds, and no longer than 30 minutes. If the work was not commercialized before, professional creator also can enter this Grand Prize. The 2007 winner, Flutter'', was the first work from a non-Asian country to win this award.

Notes
b. Best Entry Award in Amateur Category
c. Best Entry Award in Student Category
d. Competition Winning Programs

Notable Entry
The excellent works of the year are chosen according to each section.

Individual awards
The individual awards for the activities of the previous year.

Best Director
The awards for directors. Though this award does not limit to the directors of films, it has a tendency to be given to film directors.

Best Original Story
The awards for the original creators of the work. Founded in 2005.

Best Screenplay
The awards for screenwriters.

Best Screenplay / Original Story
The awards for screenwriters since 2014.

Best Art Direction
The awards for the staffs of art direction.

Best Character Designer
The awards for character designers.

Best Voice Actor
The awards for voice actors by their performance. Rumi Hiiragi (2002) and Chieko Baisho (2005) are more famous as actress in Japan.

Best Music
The awards for composers (and other music related people).

Best Animator
The awards for animators since 2014.

Merit Award

See also
 List of animation awards
 Lists of animated feature films
 BAFTA Award for Best Animated Film
 Annie Award for Best Animated Feature
 Golden Globe Award for Best Animated Feature Film
 Critics' Choice Movie Award for Best Animated Feature
 Crunchyroll Anime Awards
 Annie Award for Best Animated Feature — Independent
 Saturn Award for Best Animated Film
 Japan Media Arts Festival
 Animation Kobe

References

External links
 Tokyo Anime Award Festival
 Tokyo Anime Award

Animation awards
Anime awards
Awards established in 2002
2002 establishments in Japan
Arts organizations based in Japan